Ambrose Eccles (c. 1736–1809), full name Isaac-Ambrose Eccles, was an Anglo-Irish Shakespearean scholar.

Life
He was the son of Hugh Eccles, of Cronroe, County Wicklow, and his wife Elizabeth Ambrose. He was the grandson of Sir John Eccles. He was educated at Trinity College Dublin, and then travelled in France and Italy, but returned home through illness.

Eccles was in London in 1763, and was a guest of James Boswell at the Mitre tavern. He died in 1809, at his seat at Cronroe.

Works
Eccles was a dramatic critic, and published editions of several of Shakespeare's plays, in which he transposed scenes that appeared to him to be wrongly placed. These plays were Cymbeline, 1793; King Lear, 1793; and Merchant of Venice, 1805. They contained notes and illustrations, with critical and historical essays.

Family
Eccles married Grace Ball, eldest daughter of Thomas Ball of Urker, County Armagh. They had three sons and three daughters. Among the sons was Major Hugh Eccles, whose daughter Elizabeth Eccles married Henry Ward, 5th Viscount Bangor.

References

1730s births
Year of birth uncertain
1809 deaths
18th-century Anglo-Irish people
18th-century scholars
19th-century scholars
Alumni of Trinity College Dublin
Shakespearean scholars